Adrian N. Evangelista (born September 6, 1989) is a Filipino contemporary painter and part-time photographer. Adrian is well known for his realist and surrealist works. He also known for his portrait photography

Early career 

Adrian Evangelista is a Manila, Philippines born painter.  Being the first painter in his family, he learned how to paint during his college days. He earned his Bachelor of Fine Arts degree majoring in Painting in the University of Santo Tomas.

As a student, Adrian Evangelista was active in participating in numerous art competitions. As his earliest achievements and recognition back in  2009 Evangelista was a finalist at the PLDT National Visual Arts Competition ("Maliit Man o Malaki, May Kita Parin" Oil on Canvas), finalist at the Metrobank Art and Design Excellence ("Irony of Man’s Greed for Development" Oil on Canvas), finalist at the EMB-DENR on-the-Spot Painting  Competition, finalist at the Shell-National Students Painting Competition, MACC Painting Competition.

Career 

After graduating college, Adrian Evangelista continued participating painting competitions. In 2010, Evangelista won as a finalist in the Metrobank Art and Design Excellence painting competition. In 2013, again he won as a finalist at the Metrobank Art and Design Excellence. The following year he won again in Metrobank with his piece "Inevitable Reality" (Oil on Canvas).  He also worked as a motion graphic artist  in Globaltronics for a short time.

Throughout his career as a painter, Adrian Evangelista has participated in quite a number of collaborations and group exhibits. One of his latest Two-man show is with Dino Gabito titled "1/3" in Metro Gallery.

Exhibitions

See also 
 Daniel Evangelista

References 

1989 births
Living people
Filipino painters
People from Tondo, Manila
Artists from Metro Manila
University of Santo Tomas alumni